The Netherlands competed at the 1972 Summer Olympics in Munich, West Germany. 119 competitors, 90 men and 29 women, took part in 72 events in 16 sports.

Medalists
The Netherlands finished in 16th position in the final medal rankings, with three gold medals and five medals overall.

Gold
 Hennie Kuiper — Cycling Road, Men's Individual Road Race
 Wim Ruska — Judo, Men's Heavyweight
 Wim Ruska — Judo, Men's Open Category

Silver
 Mieke Jaapies — Canoe, Women's Flatwater K-1 500m

Bronze
 Roel Luynenburg and Ruud Stokvis — Rowing, Men's Coxless Pairs

Athletics

Men's 800 metres
Sjef Hensgens
 Heat — 1:51.2 (→ did not advance)

Men's 1500 metres
Haico Scharn
 Heat — 3:41.4
 Semifinals — 3:44.4 (→ did not advance)

Men's 5000 metres
Jos Hermens
 Heat — DNS (→ did not advance) (left Munich after the murder of the Israeli athletes)

Boxing

Men's Welterweight (– 67 kg)
 James Vrij
 First Round — Bye
 Second Round — Lost to János Kajdi (HUN), 1:4

Men's Light Middleweight (– 71 kg)
 Anthony Richardson
 First Round — Bye
 Second Round — Defeated Svetomir Belić (YUG), 3:2
 Third Round — Lost to Loucif Hamani (ALG), TKO-2

Canoeing

Cycling

Eleven cyclists represented the Netherlands in 1972.

Individual road race
 Hennie Kuiper — 04:14:37 (→  Gold Medal)
 Piet van Katwijk — 04:15:13 (→ 11th place)
 Cees Priem — 04:15:13 (→ 12th place)
 Fedor den Hertog — 04:15:13 (→ 25th place)

Team time trial
 Fedor den Hertog
 Hennie Kuiper
 Cees Priem
 Aad van den Hoek

Sprint
 Klaas Balk
 Peter van Doorn

1000m time trial
 Peter van Doorn
 Final — 1:08.09 (→ 11th place)

Tandem
 Klaas Balk and Peter van Doorn → 7th place

Individual pursuit
 Roy Schuiten

Team pursuit
 Ad Dekkers
 Gerard Kamper
 Herman Ponsteen
 Roy Schuiten

Diving

Women's 3m Springboard
 Mariette Dommers — 239.40 points (→ 23rd place)

Women's 10m Platform
 Annita Smith — 156.99 points (→ 27th place)

Equestrian

Fencing

One fencer represented the Netherlands in 1972.

Men's sabre
 Eduard Ham

Gymnastics

Hockey

Men's Team Competition
Preliminary Round (Group B)
 Drew with India (1-1)
 Defeated Poland (4-2)
 Defeated Kenya (5-1)
 Defeated New Zealand (2-0)
 Defeated Mexico (4-0)
 Lost to Great Britain (1-3)
 Defeated Australia (3-2)
Semi Final Round
 Lost to West Germany (0-3)
Bronze Medal Match
 Lost to India (1-2) → 4th place

Team Roster
 André Bolhuis
 Marinus Dijkerman
 Thijs Kaanders
 Coen Kranenberg
 Ties Kruize
 Wouter Leefers
 Flip Lidth de Jeude
 Paul Litjens
 Irving van Nes
 Maarten Sikking (gk)
 Frans Spits
 Nico Spits
 Bert Taminiau
 Kick Thole
 Pieter Weemers
 Jeroen Zweerts

Judo

Modern pentathlon

Three male pentathletes represented the Netherlands in 1972.

Men's Individual Competition:
 Jan Bekkenk — 4391 points (→ 46th place)
 Rob Vonk — 4153 points (→ 53rd place)
 Henk Krediet — 3786 points (→ 58th place)

Men's Team Competition:
 Bekkenk, Vonk, and Krediet — 12340 points (→ 18th place)

Rowing

Men's Coxless Pairs
Roel Luynenburg and Ruud Stokvis
Heat — 7:26.80
Repechage — 7:38.51
Semi Finals — 7:41.86
Final — 6:58.70 (→  Bronze Medal)

Men's Coxed Pairs
Bernard Luttikhuizen, René Kieft and Herman Zaanen
Heat — 8:00.15
Repechage — 8:17.37 (→ did not advance)

Men's Coxed Fours
Wim Grothuis, Evert Kroes, Jan Willem van Woudenberg, Johan ter Haar, and Kees de Korver 
Heat — 6:53.30
Semi Finals — 7:23.66
B-Final — 7:05.83 (→ 7th place)

Men's Eights
Henk Rouwé, Jannes Munneke, Frank Mulder, Hans Huisinga, Jan van der Vliet, Herman Eggink, Bram Tuinzing, Pieter Offens, and Rutger Stuffken
Heat — 6:13.03
Semi Finals — 6:31.70
B-Final — 6:23.55 (→ 9th place)

Sailing

Shooting

Three male shooters represented Netherlands in 1972.

50 m rifle, prone
 Willy Hillen

Skeet
 Ben Pon
 Eric Swinkels

Swimming

Men's 200m Freestyle 
 Peter Prijdekker
 Heat – 1:58.78 (→ did not advance, 18th place)

Men's 400m Freestyle 
 Ton van Klooster
 Heat – 4:11.72 (→ did not advance, 17th place)

Men's 1500m Freestyle 
 Ton van Klooster
 Heat – 16:34.77 (→ did not advance, 12th place)

Men's 100m Backstroke 
 Bob Schoutsen
 Heat – 1:00.76 
 Semi Final – 1:00.48 (→ did not advance, 9th place)

Men's 200m Backstroke 
 Bob Schoutsen
 Heat – 2:10.56 (→ did not advance, 9th place)

Men's 200m Individual Medley
 François van Kruijsdijk
 Heat – 2:17.14 (→ did not advance, 24th place)

Men's 400m Individual Medley
 Roger van Hamburg
 Heat – 4:50.70 (→ did not advance, 19th place)

Men's 4 × 100 m Freestyle Relay 
 Peter Prijdekker, Bert Bergsma, Roger van Hamburg, and Hans Elzerman
 Heat – 3:41.36 (→ did not advance, 11th place)

Men's 4 × 200 m Freestyle Relay 
 Peter Prijdekker, Bert Bergsma, Roger van Hamburg, and Hans Elzerman
 Heat – 8:00.87 (→ did not advance, 10th place)

Women's 100m Freestyle 
 Enith Brigitha
 Heat – 1:00.02
 Semi Final – 59.75
 Final – 1:00.09 (→ 8th place)

 Hansje Bunschoten
 Heat – 1:00.82
 Semi Final – 1:00.79 (→ did not advance, 12th place)

 Anke Rijnders
 Heat – 1:00.76
 Semi Final – 1:00.84 (→ did not advance, 13th place)

Women's 200m Freestyle 
 Hansje Bunschoten
 Heat – 2:08.58
 Final – 2:08.40 (→ 6th place)

 Anke Rijnders
 Heat – 2:09.09
 Final – 2:09.41 (→ 7th place)

Women's 400m Freestyle 
 Hansje Bunschoten
 Heat – 4:31.76
 Final – 4:29.70 (→ 7th place)

 Anke Rijnders
 Heat – 4:29.94
 Final – 4:31.51 (→ 8th place)

Women's 800m Freestyle 
 Hansje Bunschoten
 Heat – 9:21.13
 Final – 9:16.69 (→ 7th place)

Women's 100m Backstroke
 Enith Brigitha
 Heat – 1:06.71
 Semi Final – 1:06.49
 Final – 1:06.82 (→ 6th place)

 Annemarie Groen
 Heat – 1:09.55 (→ did not advance, 21st place)

 Marianne Vermaat
 Heat – 1:09.14
 Semi Final – 1:09.11 (→ did not advance, 16th place)

Women's 200m Backstroke
 Enith Brigitha
 Heat – 2:23.70
 Final – 2:23.70 (→ 6th place)

 Annemarie Groen
 Heat – 2:29.17 (→ did not advance, 23rd place)

Women's 100m Breaststroke
 Alie te Riet
 Heat – 1:18.79 (→ did not advance, 20th place)

 Tineke Hofland
 Heat – 1:19.38 (→ did not advance, 28th place)

Women's 200m Breaststroke
 Alie te Riet
 Heat – 2:28.49 (→ did not advance, 17th place)

 Josien Elzerman
 Heat – 2:28.18 (→ did not advance, 19th place)

Women's 100m Butterfly
 Frieke Buys
 Heat – 1:06.89
 Semi Final – 1:06.78 (→ did not advance, 12th place)

Women's 200m Butterfly
 Frieke Buys
 Heat – 2:24.20 (→ did not advance, 9th place)

Women's 200m Individual Medley
 Hennie Penterman
 Heat – 2:28.99 (→ did not advance, 12th place)

 Wijda Mazereeuw
 Heat – 2:32.59 (→ did not advance, 26th place)

 Gerda Lassooy
 Heat – 2:32.92 (→ did not advance, 30th place)

Women's 400m Individual Medley
 Hennie Penterman
 Heat – 5:41.99 (→ did not advance, 11th place)

 Gerda Lassooy
 Heat – 5:22.09 (→ did not advance, 21st place)

 Wijda Mazereeuw
 Heat – 5:24.00 (→ did not advance, 23rd place)

Women's 4 × 100 m Freestyle Relay
 Enith Brigitha, Anke Rijnders, Hansje Bunschoten, and Josien Elzerman
 Heat – 4:02.70
 Final – 4:01.49 (→ 5th place)

Women's 4 × 100 m Medley Relay
 Enith Brigitha, Alie te Riet, Frieke Buys, and Anke Rijnders
 Heat – 4:32.20
 Enith Brigitha, Alie te Riet, Anke Rijnders, and Hansje Bunschoten
 Final – 4:29.99 (→ 5th place)

Water polo

Men's Team Competition
Preliminary Round (Group B)
 Lost to Hungary (0-3)
 Defeated Australia (4-2)
 Drew with West Germany (4-4)
 Defeated Greece (6-2)
Final Round (Group II)
 Defeated Bulgaria (5-2)
 Defeated Cuba (8-6)
 Drew with Romania (5-5)
 Defeated Spain (7-5) → 7th place

 Team Roster
 Mart Bras
 Ton Buunk
 Wim Hermsen
 Hans Hoogveld
 Evert Kroon
 Hans Parrel
 Ton Schmidt
 Wim van de Schilde
 Gijze Stroboer
 Jan Evert Veer
 Hans Wouda

References

Nations at the 1972 Summer Olympics
1972 Summer Olympics
S